Bruce Muller (born 24 February 1989 in Klerksdorp, South Africa) is a South African rugby union player, currently playing with the . His regular position is prop or hooker.

Career

Youth

In 2010, he played for East Rand side  in the 2010 Under-19 Provincial Championship.

Falcons

Despite not playing in the 2013 Vodacom Cup, he returned for the 2013 Currie Cup First Division to make twelve appearances.

Rustenburg Impala

He joined club side Rustenburg Impala for the 2015 season.

References

South African rugby union players
Living people
1989 births
People from Klerksdorp
Rugby union props
Rugby union hookers
Falcons (rugby union) players
Rugby union players from North West (South African province)